The Central Connecticut Blue Devils football program is the intercollegiate football team for Central Connecticut State University located in the U.S. state of Connecticut. The team competes in the NCAA Division I Football Championship Subdivision (FCS) and are members of the Northeast Conference. Central Connecticut State's first football team was fielded in 1935. The team plays its home games at the 5,500 seat Arute Field in New Britain, Connecticut. The Blue Devils are coached by Adam Lechtenberg.

History

Classifications
1959–1962: NAIA
1963–1972: NCAA College Division
1973–1992: NCAA Division II
1993–present: NCAA Division I–AA/FCS

Conference memberships
1935–1941: Independent
1942–1945: No team
1946–1964: Independent
1965–1974: Eastern Football Conference
1975–1992: Division II Independent
1993–1995: Division I–AA Independent
1996–present: Northeast Conference

Championships

Conference

† Co-championship

FCS Playoffs results
The Blue Devils have made two appearances in the FCS Playoffs. Their record is 0–2.

Future non-conference opponents 
Future non-conference opponents announced as of January 20, 2023.

References

External links
 

 
American football teams established in 1935
1935 establishments in Connecticut